This is a list of singles that peaked in the Top 10 of the Irish Singles Chart during 2007 (see 2007 in Irish music).

 The "Top 10 Entry Date" is when the song entered the Top 10 for the first time.
 Songs that were still in the Top 10 at the beginning of 2007 but peaked in 2006 are provided in the 2006 Peaks segment at the bottom of the page.

Top 10 singles

Notes
 - The single re-entered the top 10 on 4 January 2007.
 - The single re-entered the top 10 on 8 March 2007.
 - The single re-entered the top 10 on 29 March 2007.
 - The single re-entered the top 10 on 3 May 2007.
 - The single re-entered the top 10 on 7 June 2007.
 - The single re-entered the top 10 on 14 June 2007.
 - The single re-entered the top 10 on 30 August 2007.
 - The single peaked at #4 in 1990.
 - The single re-entered the top 10 on 8 November 2007.
 - The single peaked at #1 in 1987.
 - The single re-entered the top 10 on 6 December 2007.
 - The single peaked at #3 in 1994.
 - The single re-entered the top 10 on 27 December 2007.
 - The single re-entered the top 10 on 3 January 2008.

See also
2007 in Irish music
List of number-one singles of 2007 (Ireland)

References

2007 in Irish music
Ireland
Irish music-related lists
Irish record charts